Gaël Pencreach (born 5 August 1977 in Le Creusot) is a retired French athlete who specialised in the 3000 metres steeplechase. He represented his country at the 2000 Summer Olympics placing 14th in the final.

Competition record

Personal bests
Outdoor
3000 metres – 7:58.73 (Villeneuve-d'Ascq 2002)
5000 metres – 15:12.05 (Albuquerque 2002)
3000 metres steeplechase – 8:13.16 (Saint-Denis 1999)
Indoor
1500 metres – 3:48.49 (Mondeville 2005)
3000 metres – 7:57.03 (Liévin 1999)

References

1977 births
Living people
French male steeplechase runners
Olympic athletes of France
Athletes (track and field) at the 2000 Summer Olympics
Sportspeople from Le Creusot
World Athletics Championships athletes for France
Mediterranean Games bronze medalists for France
Mediterranean Games medalists in athletics
Athletes (track and field) at the 2005 Mediterranean Games